Escola Catolica Estrela do Mar or E.M is a Catholic preschool through secondary school in São Lourenço (Saint Lawrence Parish), Macau, China. The school has an annual event held on 8 December each year which commemorates the construction of the school.
The registration school serial number at the Education and Youth Affairs Bureau (Macau) ("Direcção dos Serviços de Educação e Juventude" or DSEJ; 教育暨青年局) is 004 and 005 for the branch. It is a member of the Macau Catholic Schools Association.

History
At the beginning of the 20th century, a Portuguese man named Jesus met a representative from the Macau Catholic church after receiving and accepting an invitation from the parish bishop in regards to doing some missionary work in the Chinese Gaoyao County. This man Jesus gained knowledge about the local culture and learnt about the Christ gospel conformity. In 1917 the Guangdong Province Zhaoqing government office organization began to educate young children.

In 1950 the school had to abandon its operations due to the chaos caused by war and the political situation at the time. During this period Jesus met a priest by the name of Father Ge Chentung after travelling through many parts of the countryside and eventually arriving in Macau. Whilst he was in Macau, he witnessed the economic depression and saw the impact it had on the innumerable impoverished families of the region. He then decided to build a school similar to the one in Macau and manage its operations. He named it the Sea Star Middle school, it was located in one of the main streets of Macau. He provided free elementary education for poor students who couldn't afford education elsewhere. He spread the gospel and witnessed to anyone that would listen, he also imitated Kong Zi and taught people from all walks of life without discriminating against them. Up until 1959, Father Ge followed orders assigned to him from  Portugal. In 1959, Father Tan met other palm sea star school principals. From 1964 to 1974, Shengje Yu the Chinese zither made repairs to the courtyard adding additional class rooms. In July, 1975, the church parish bishop appointed church parish Father Liu Chihch'ao to the position of assistant director.

The school continued to operate until it was dismantled in 1955. A new school was constructed and the Ministry of Education Centre was also set up and operational. The sea star middle school gradually became notable within the community, a preschool was also established along with an elementary school.

In 1997, due to high unemployment within the large population of Macau, Father Tan held the Jesus meeting once again. This resulted in the junior middle school degree diploma, the night four, center five and center six curricula being added to the school program.

46 years on and the Sea Star Middle School is still running. The Jesus meeting is held regularly, some topics discussed are "the promotion of justice, services for the poor" free education and positive school spirit. The motto is to teach all comers without discrimination in abidance with the school policy. The aim of the school is to help publicize the gospel of Christ and to use this as an example for all students. Some of the other programs are personality education, development of human nature and the thorough study of science. Youth education is the principal duty. In July, 2002, Father Tan came up with plans for future renovations. The changes were made by Mr. Cai Tzuyu, who holds the duty of third palm principal.

See also
Wah Yan College, Hong Kong
Wah Yan College, Kowloon
Colégio Mateus Ricci
Instituto D. Melchior Carneiro|zh|取潔中學 (取潔中學 Chui Kit School, Macao)

References

Catholic secondary schools in Macau